The USWA Women's Championship was a women's professional wrestling title in the American professional wrestling promotion, the United States Wrestling Association.

Title history

Combined reigns

See also 
United States Wrestling Association

References 

United States Wrestling Association championships
Women's professional wrestling championships